Nils Liess (born 24 August 1996) is a Swiss swimmer. He competed in the men's 200 metre freestyle event at the 2017 World Aquatics Championships. In 2014, he represented Switzerland at the 2014 Summer Youth Olympics held in Nanjing, China.

References

External links
 

1996 births
Living people
Swimmers at the 2014 Summer Youth Olympics
Swiss male freestyle swimmers
Swimmers at the 2020 Summer Olympics
Olympic swimmers of Switzerland
20th-century Swiss people
21st-century Swiss people